This is a list of the 30 Major League Baseball teams from the 2011 season, ranked by total team salary.

References

Major League Baseball lists
Major League Baseball statistics
Major League Baseball, payroll, 2011